Robert Frederick Reckman (April 7, 1922 – August 27, 2016) was an American attorney and politician who served as a member of the Ohio House of Representatives. He was the speaker of the Ohio House from 1965 to 1967. He died in Cincinnati, Ohio in August 2016, at the age of 94.

References

1922 births
2016 deaths
Members of the Ohio House of Representatives